George Frederick Morgan (April 25, 1922 – February 20, 2004) was a poet, the co-founder (1947) and long-time editor (1948–1998) of the literary quarterly The Hudson Review and an heir to a fortune built on soap.

Morgan attended Princeton University, where he studied under Allen Tate.  Morgan also translated poems from the French.

Bibliography 
The Tarot of Cornelius Agrippa (1974) Sagarin Press
The Night Sky (2002), Story Line Press
The One Abiding (2003) Story Line Press
Poems for Paula (1995), Story Line Press
 Poems: New and Selected  (1987), University of Illinois Press
 Northbook (1982), University of Illinois Press
Poems of the Two Worlds (1977), University of Illinois Press

about
Lieberman, Laurence. "William Stafford and Frederick Morgan: The Shocks Of Normality" in Beyond the Muse of Memory: Essays on Contemporary American Poets (1995), University of Missouri

Personal life
Morgan was married three times and had six children. His third wife, Paula Dietz, in 1998 succeeded him as editor of  The Hudson Review. One of Morgan's sons from an earlier marriage to Constance Canfield was the novelist Seth Morgan.

Further reading

References

External links
 The Hudson Review, his longtime publication

1922 births
2004 deaths
20th-century American poets
Princeton University alumni